These are the official results of the Men's 100 metres event at the 1990 European Championships in Split, Yugoslavia, held at Stadion Poljud on 27 and 28 August 1990.

Medalists

Results

Final
28 August
Wind: 2.2 m/s

Semi-finals
28 August

Semi-final 1
Wind: 0.3 m/s

Semi-final 2
Wind: -0.2 m/s

Heats
27 August

Heat 1
Wind: -1.2 m/s

Heat 2
Wind: 0 m/s

Heat 3
Wind: -0.9 m/s

Heat 4
Wind: 1.1 m/s

Participation
According to an unofficial count, 31 athletes from 16 countries participated in the event.

 (1)
 (1)
 (1)
 (1)
 (3)
 (3)
 (3)
 (2)
 (3)
 (1)
 (3)
 (3)
 (1)
 (1)
 (3)
 (1)

See also
 1988 Men's Olympic 100 metres (Seoul)
 1991 Men's World Championships 100 metres (Tokyo)
 1992 Men's Olympic 100 metres (Barcelona)

References

 Results

100
100 metres at the European Athletics Championships